The Green-Eyed Monster is a lost 1916 silent film drama directed by J. Gordon Edwards and starring Robert B. Mantell.

Cast
Robert B. Mantell - Raimond de Mornay
Genevieve Hamper - Claire
Stuart Holmes - Louis de Mornay
Pauline Barry - The Governess (*as Miss Barry)
Henry Leone - ?
Charles Davidson - ?
Charles Crompton - ?

See also
1937 Fox vault fire
 The Green Eyed Monster (1919 film)
 The Green-Eyed Monster (2001 film)

References

External links
The Green-Eyed Monster at IMDb.com

1916 films
American silent feature films
Lost American films
Films directed by J. Gordon Edwards
American black-and-white films
Fox Film films
Silent American drama films
1916 drama films
1916 lost films
Lost drama films
Eye color
1910s American films
1910s English-language films